Mary Rose Thacker (April 9, 1922 – August 5, 1983) was a Canadian former singles figure skater and a three-time (1939, 1941–1942) national and two-time (1939 and 1941) North American champion. She began skating at the Winnipeg skating club at the age of three years. In 1937 she became Canadian junior ladies' champion. At 16 years old in 1939 she won both the national and North American titles. She retired as a competitive skater in 1942 and became a coach. She started a skating school in British Columbia in 1947 and trained skaters for the next 35 years. She was inducted into the Canadian Figure Skating Hall of Fame as an athlete in 1995. She is also a member of the Manitoba Sports Hall of Fame.

Results

References

 1995 Canadian Figure Skating Hall of Fame Induction
 James R. Hines: Historical Dictionary of Figure Skating

1922 births
1983 deaths
Canadian female single skaters
Sportspeople from Victoria, British Columbia
Sportspeople from Winnipeg
Manitoba Sports Hall of Fame inductees